Reginald Lee Pierson (He was born in Los Angeles, California and attended Centennial High School, then Arizona Western College and finally Oklahoma State University.

References

Living people
1952 births
Detroit Lions players
Tampa Bay Buccaneers players
Winnipeg Blue Bombers players
American football defensive backs
Oklahoma State Cowboys football players
Arizona Western Matadors football players